Dr. Kathleen Marie Bell Cooper (born 3 February 1945, Dallas, Texas) is a corporate economist and former governmental economist who has worked for companies such as ExxonMobil and Security Pacific National Bank as well as being in leadership for such groups as the National Association of Business Economists. She is currently a director for the Williams Companies. She was the Under Secretary for Economic Affairs at the United States Department of Commerce during part of George W. Bush's presidency.

Early life 
Kathleen Bell was born to parents Ferne Elizabeth (McDougle) Bell and Patrick Joseph Bell in Dallas, Texas, in 1945. She married Ronald James Cooper at age 20. The couple had two sons, Michael and Christopher, in the late 70s and early 80s.

Education 
Cooper graduated in 1970 with a bachelor's degree in mathematics from the University of Texas at Arlington, and one year later with a master's degree. 

After some time in industry, she returned for her PhD at the University of Colorado Boulder. She taught while continuing her corporate career.

Later in life, she became a trustee of Scripps College.

Career

Banking 
Cooper spent 9 years at the United Banks of Colorado after her masters degree, and was promoted to chief economist. She moved on to led the Economic Department at Security Pacific National Bank in 1981.

Energy 
She became chief economist for Exxon in 1990, then expanded her role when Exxon merged with Mobil Oil and led the Economics and Energy Division.

After her governmental stint, Cooper became a director, including chair of the board, for the Williams Companies. She continued that role into 2020.

Government 
In 2001, Cooper was confirmed as the Under Secretary for Economic Affairs at the United States Department of Commerce. This was her first and only political appointment and governmental role. She held the role until 2005.

Academic 
Cooper's first professional role was as a research assistant at the University of Texas at Arlington.

Cooper was a part-time lecturer during her time at United Banks around 1980. 

She became dean of the College of Business Administration at the University of North Texas in 2006.

Professional memberships 
Cooper has been a part of:

 National Association of Business Economics (president, 1985-86)
 U.S. Association of Energy Economics (president, 1996)
 International Women's Forum (treasurer, 1999-2001)
 Committee for Economic Development
 American Council on Capital Formation
 Conference of Business Economists

References 

University of Texas at Arlington alumni
University of Colorado Boulder alumni
University of North Texas faculty
1945 births
Living people